Mount Audubon is a high mountain summit of the Indian Peaks in the northern Front Range of the Rocky Mountains of North America. The mountain was named in honor of John James Audubon.

See also

List of Colorado mountain ranges
List of Colorado mountain summits
List of Colorado fourteeners
List of Colorado 4000 meter prominent summits
List of the most prominent summits of Colorado
List of Colorado county high points

References

External links

Audubon
Mountains of Boulder County, Colorado
Roosevelt National Forest
North American 4000 m summits